Narayan Sadoba Kajrolkar  was an Indian independence activist, Gandhian and social worker, best known as the man who defeated B. R. Ambedkar in a general election. A Marathi by birth, he served as a personal assistant to Ambedkar, before contesting against him in the first Lok Sabha elections from the Mumbai North Central constituency in 1952 and defeated the latter by over 15000 votes. He was also elected from the same constituency for a second time in the 1962 elections.

Narayan, who was born in the SC community, was a member of the first Backward Classes Commission of 1953, representing the Scheduled Caste communities. He was also a member of the Dalit Varga Sangha, an organisation of the people of backward classes and served as the secretary of the committee when they decided to celebrate the birthday of Jagjivan Ram on 5 April 1953. The Government of India awarded him the third highest civilian honour of the Padma Bhushan, in 1970, for his contributions to society.

Kajrolkar criticized Ambedkar, saying that he is biased enough to spend funds on his own caste, the Mahar, instead of dividing the funds equally among others such as the Chambars and the Mangs.

He died in 1983.

See also 
 Mumbai North Central (Lok Sabha constituency)
 Kalelkar Commission

References 

Recipients of the Padma Bhushan in social work
Year of birth missing
India MPs 1952–1957
Indian independence activists from Maharashtra
Indian National Congress politicians
Lok Sabha members from Maharashtra
Social workers
Gandhians
Politicians from Mumbai
1983 deaths
Marathi politicians
India MPs 1962–1967
Social workers from Maharashtra